Denair Unified School District is a school district based in Stanislaus County, California, United States.

References

External links

School districts in Stanislaus County, California